Brian Thomas Ray (born January 4, 1955) is an American session musician, guitarist, bassist, singer–songwriter, and musical director. He is best known for his work as a bass, rhythm, and lead guitarist with Paul McCartney's touring band, though he has worked with an extensive list of artists in addition to his own solo career.

Early life 
Brian Ray grew up in Southern California. His first musical performances were in front of his peers – at show and tell – setting his own lyrics to the tune of old folk songs.

By the age of nine, he began playing the guitar. His elder sister, Jean (of folk duo Jim and Jean) spurred his interest in rock music through her record collection. Jean invited Brian to play at the LA Troubadour when he was 15 years old. She was "probably the most important and influential person" in Ray's early life.

Career 
In 1973, shortly after graduating from high school, Ray began his musical career as part of Bobby Pickett and the Crypt Kicker Five, playing the "Monster Mash" at a fundraising benefit hosted by and for Phil Kaufman. Kaufman took Ray in and would later introduce him to singer Etta James at a rehearsal for the world-famous Troubadour, just as James was on the brink of a career comeback. That brief introduction would eventually lead to Ray's 14-year career as Etta James' musical director and guitarist.

While working for Etta James, Ray also shared stages with musicians such as Keith Richards, Santana, Joe Cocker, Bonnie Raitt, John Lee Hooker, and Bo Diddley. At this time he also began focusing more on songwriting. Ray spent the late 1980s collaborating with musicians such as Peter Frampton, Rita Coolidge, Nicolette Larson, Michael Steele (of The Bangles), and Steve LeGassick, who became a songwriting partner for 13 years. It was this songwriting partnership with LeGassick that would create the 1987 Smokey Robinson award-winning hit "One Heartbeat", which has received over 2,000,000 airplays.

Prior to working with Paul McCartney in 2002, Ray was working on tour in France with two different French artists, Mylène Farmer and Johnny Hallyday. Abe Laboriel Jr., a drummer who had previously worked with Brian Ray, mentioned that Paul McCartney was in search of a guitarist who could switch between guitar and bass guitar (for songs on which McCartney plays piano or guitar). After meeting with McCartney's producer for Driving Rain, David Kahne, Ray joined Paul McCartney for the pre-game performance of "Freedom" at the NFL's Super Bowl XXXVI in 2002.

Ray joined the rest of Paul McCartney's band for the Driving Rain tour in promotion of the album. As of then, he has appeared on McCartney's solo albums, such as Back in the World, Back in the U.S., Memory Almost Full, New and Egypt Station as well as three concert DVDs: Paul McCartney in Red Square, The Space Within US, and Good Evening New York City.

In addition to being a session musician, Brian Ray has also contributed to film scores such as the soundtrack to the film Heartbreakers in 1984. In 2002, Ray and Abe Laboriel Jr. composed the score for the independent film The Failures. In 2011, Ray joined with Oliver Leiber to form The Bayonets.

Solo career 
After decades of performing, writing, and recording with musical artists, Brian Ray released his first solo album, Mondo Magneto, on October 16, 2006 through his record label Whooray Records.

"People have always asked me when I was going to do my own thing", Ray said, "I guess I was just busy."

Musicians on Mondo Magneto include Scott Shriner from Weezer, Davey Faragher from Elvis Costello's band, as well as Abe Laboriel, Jr., Wix Wickens, and Rusty Anderson from Paul McCartney's band.

When Ray asked the blues singer and his former boss Etta James if she would sing with him on the album her answer was simple, and immediate – "I'll do anything for Brian."

Mondo Magneto's record release party was held at The Mint in Los Angeles, California, on January 21, 2006. Ray's live band, Black Unicorn, includes musicians Peter Thorn on guitar, John Button on bass, and Matt Laug on drums. The band performs their music in Los Angeles clubs, such as The Viper Room and The Mint.

In 2008, Larry Graves and Brian Ray made a video for Ray's song "Coming Up Roses".

In 2010, Ray released a second album, entitled This Way Up.

Discography

See also 
 The Bayonets

References

External links 

 
 
 Maccareport - Brian Ray 

Brian Ray interview - How To Make Your Band Sound Great book

American rock guitarists
American male guitarists
American session musicians
American rock songwriters
American rock singers
Singer-songwriters from California
1955 births
Living people
Guitarists from California
Lead guitarists
Rhythm guitarists
American rock bass guitarists
American male bass guitarists
20th-century American guitarists
20th-century American male musicians
American male singer-songwriters
Paul McCartney Band members